Rembrandt Harmenszoon van Rijn  (1606–1669) was a renowned Dutch painter. 

Rembrandt may also refer to:

Film and television
Rembrandt (1936 film), a film starring Charles Laughton
Rembrandt (1940 film), a Dutch film made by Gerard Rutten
Rembrandt (1942 film), a German-language film
Rembrandt: A Self-Portrait, a 1954 short documentary film
Rembrandt (1999 film), a film by Charles Matton
Stealing Rembrandt or Rembrandt, a 2003 Danish film
 Rembrandt, a fictional gang member in the 1979 film The Warriors

Ships
SS Rembrandt, a 1959-built ocean liner
S/V Rembrandt van Rĳn, a 1924-built tall ship

Other uses
Rembrandt (given name)
Rembrandt (crater), an impact basin on Mercury
Rembrandt (horse), a dressage horse
Rembrandt (train), a European train service launched in 1967
Rembrandt, Iowa, a city in the United States
The Rembrandts, an American pop-rock band
Rembrandt Group, a South African tobacco and industrial company
Rembrandt toothpaste, dental cosmetics line
 Rembrandt, a 1931 novel by Theun de Vries
 Rembrandt, a codename for AMD microprocessors

See also